Ezequiel Monteiro Baptista (born 27 March 1926) is a Portuguese former footballer who played as midfielder.

External links 
 
 

1926 births
Possibly living people
Portuguese footballers
Association football defenders
Primeira Liga players
S.C. Braga players
Portugal international footballers